Sarmasti (also Romanized as Sarmastī) is a village in Qaen Rural District, in the Central District of Qaen County, South Khorasan Province, Iran. At the 2006 census, its population was 37, in 9 families.

References 

Populated places in Qaen County